Sanne Veldkamp (born 21 July 1997) is a Dutch professional squash player. She achieved her highest career PSA singles ranking of 94 in August 2019.

References

External links 

 Profile at PSA
 

1997 births
Living people
Dutch female squash players
Sportspeople from Amsterdam